Meitei Vaishnavism or Manipuri Vaishnavism is a religious sub-denomination of Vaishnavism of Hinduism, followed by Meitei ethnicity of Manipur, Assam, Tripura, Bangladesh and Myanmar. It was founded in Medieval Manipur and continues to be the largest religion in the present day Modern Manipur.

Historically, King Charairongba was the first ruler of Manipur to formally adopt Vaishnavism as his family religion, though he did not enforce the faith to his subjects, and the reign of King Chandrakirti Singh was the "Golden Period of Vaishnavism" in Manipur kingdom.

See Also 

 Meitei Hindus

References 

History of Manipur
Meitei culture
Pages with unreviewed translations
Vaishnava sects
Religion in India